Florencia is a female given name. Notable people with the name include:

 Florencia Bertotti
 Florencia Cerutti
 Florencia de la V
 Florencia Habif (born 1993), Argentine field hockey player
 Florencia Lozano
 Florencia Molinero
 Florencia Peña (born 1974), Argentine actress
 Florencia Sánchez Morales

Feminine given names